Samsung Galaxy C5 2017 is an Android smartphone produced by Samsung Electronics. It was unveiled and released in October 2017. 

The Galaxy C5 2017 is powered  16megapixels rear camera with LED flash, f/1.9 aperture, auto-focus and a 16megapixels with f/1.9 aperture, also equipped with LED flash

Specifications

Hardware
The phone is powered by Qualcomm MSM8953-Pro Snapdragon 617, an Octa Core processor, Adreno 405 GPU and 4 GB RAM with 32/64 GB of internal storage and a 2600mAh battery. The Samsung Galaxy C5 is fitted with a 5.2-inch Super Amoled display screen

Software
This phone comes with Android 7.0. It supports 4G VOLTE with dual SIM enabled 4G. It also supports Samsung Knox and Samsung Pay

See also
 Samsung Galaxy J
 Samsung Galaxy
 Samsung
 Android (operating system)
 Samsung Galaxy J2

References

Galaxy Core
Samsung smartphones
Android (operating system) devices
Mobile phones introduced in 2017
Discontinued smartphones